The EuroLeague MVP of the Month is the award of Europe's premier level basketball league, the EuroLeague, for the most valuable player of each month of the season. The award began in the 2004–05 season, after the EuroLeague eliminated the EuroLeague regular season and EuroLeague top 16 MVP awards. From the 2004–05 season to the 2015–16 season, the EuroLeague awarded an MVP for each month of the season, rather than giving MVP awards for the "regular season stage" (the first group stage of the competition), and the Top 16 stage (the second group stage of the competition), as it had done in earlier seasons.

EuroLeague Monthly MVPs

Statistics

Wins by player

Wins by country (player's nationality)

Wins by club

Wins by country (club's nationality)

Notes

References

See also 
EuroLeague Awards
50 Greatest EuroLeague Contributors
EuroLeague Basketball 2001–10 All-Decade Team
EuroLeague MVP of the Week

External links
 EuroLeague Official Web Page
 InterBasket EuroLeague Basketball Forum
 TalkBasket EuroLeague Basketball Forum
 

MVP of the Month
Basketball most valuable player awards